Hanna Guðrún Stefánsdóttir (born 11 February 1979)  is an Icelandic team handball player for Stjarnan of the Úrvalsdeild kvenna. She has won the Icelandic championship five times and the Icelandic Cup six times. She has been selected the Úrvalsdeild Player of the Year three times and led the league in scoring in 2003, 2005 and 2009. Hanna has participated in three major international tournaments with the Icelandic national team and is second all-time in both games and goals scored for the team with 458 goals in 142 games.

Career
Hanna started her career during the 1995-1996 season with Haukar. Hanna joined Stjarnan in 2010. In July 2019, she signed a one-year contract extension with Stjarnan.

In July 2021, she signed a 2-year contract extension with Stjarnan.

National handball team
Hanna is the second most capped player in Iceland's national handball team history with 142 games. She participated at the 2011 World Women's Handball Championship in Brazil.

Awards, titles and accomplishments

Awards
Icelandic Female Handball Player of the Year: 2009
Úrvalsdeild kvenna Player of the Year (4): 2003, 2005, 2009, 2010

Titles
Icelandic champion (5): 1996, 1997, 2001, 2002, 2005
Icelandic Cup (5): 1997, 2006, 2007, 2016, 2017

Accomplishments
Úrvalsdeild kvenna Top goal scorer (5): 2003, 2005, 2006, 2009, 2010

References

1979 births
Living people
Hanna Gudrun Stefansdottir
Hanna Gudrun Stefansdottir
Hanna Gudrun Stefansdottir